The National High School Hall of Fame is a program of the National Federation of State High School Associations (NFHS) that honors individuals who have made outstanding contributions to high school sports or performing arts. As of 2019, a total of 482 individuals have been inducted since the first class in 1982. Because there is a huge pool of potential candidates, it is considered a very exclusive hall of fame.

Selection Process

Each of the National Federation's 51 member associations (50 state associations plus the District of Columbia) is allowed to submit a nomination in six categories: athlete, coach, contest official, administrator, performing arts, and other. A screening committee narrows the field before a separate selection committee makes the final decision. A class generally includes 12 inductees, although some have been larger or smaller.

Many famous professional, college, and Olympic athletes and coaches have been inducted into the National High School Hall of Fame, but the selection criteria have always focused on a candidate's high school career or connection to high school competition as an adult.

History

The program was originally known as the National High School Sports Hall of Fame. The word "Sports" was dropped in 2003 when a category for performing arts was added.

The first class was announced in November 1982 and honored on December 14, 1982, in conjunction with the National Athletic Directors Conference in Indianapolis. By design the inaugural class did not include any athletes. Later classes have included members from all categories. For many years the National Federation displayed plaques representing the inductees at its headquarters in Kansas City, Missouri, while it developed plans for a museum in a separate building nearby. Those plans were later scrapped, and when the Federation moved its headquarters to Indianapolis, Indiana, the plaques were transferred to the respective state high school associations for display.

Since 1986, the Hall of Fame enshrinement ceremony has been the final event of the National Federation's annual summer meeting, which is held in late June and early July and attended by board members and executives of the state associations.

Inductees by Year 

In 2012 biographical sketches of inductees were includes in a commemorative 30 year book. The NHFS also maintains biographical sketches of inductees on their website. Below is a list of inductee names.
Following each name is the category in which the person was inducted and the state high school association that submitted the nomination. Inductees who spent all or a portion of their career on the staff of the National Federation are indicated by "NF".

Notes

References
 Published in connection with the National Federation's centennial.
 Includes a chapter on the National High School Hall of Fame.
 Includes biographies from 1982 to 2012.
 Includes recent biographies.

All-sports halls of fame
Halls of fame in Indiana
Sports hall of fame inductees
Awards established in 1982
Organizations based in Indianapolis